Dr. Merridee Bujaki is a tenured professor of accounting at the University of Ottawa located in Ottawa, Ontario, Canada. In 2005, she became tenured as a full-time professor, now the manager of Accounting Studies and the section coordinator for Accounting, Finance and Information Systems. She is also the Secretary-Treasurer for the Association of Professors at the University of Ottawa and VP of Communications for the Canadian Academic Accounting Association. Bujaki's primary activities are accounting and organizational behavior research.

Education

In 1985, Bujaki graduated from Queen's University with a Bachelor of Arts Degree, majoring in Psychology. In 1988, she received her Master of Business Administration (MBA) degree from Queen's University, specializing in Accounting. In 1996, Bujaki graduated with her Ph.D. degree with a dissertation topic related to accounting and Organizational Behavior. She obtained her Ph.D. from Queen's University. Although Bujaki spends much time in research, some of her teaching interests include Auditing, Financial Statement Analysis, Financial Accounting, Managerial Accounting and Gender Issues in Management.

Work experience

After graduating from her MBA program, Bujaki joined the Toronto office of international accounting firm Price Waterhouse. From 1988-1991, Bujaki worked in the Toronto office with Independent Business Service and the Mississauga office with general audit and assurance services. In 1989, she passed her Uniform Evaluation (UFE) and obtained her Chartered Accountant designation one year later. Throughout her academic career, she has worked on consulting projects for the Canadian Institute of Chartered Accountants (CICA). She has also served as a seminar leader and case reviewer for the Institute of Chartered Accountants of Ontario (ICAO) School of Accountancy.

Research Interests and Publications

Dr. Bujaki's research interests are primarily concentrated in four areas. They include measurement and validity issues in accounting research, annual report disclosures, women in management and the work-family interface. Bujaki's articles have been published in many journals, including the Journal of Accounting Literature, Canadian Accounting Perspectives, Women in Management Review and Applied Psychology: An International Review. She has also published articles in profession-based periodicals such as CA Magazine and CMA Magazine. Currently, she is focused on researching accounting and managerial perspectives for the development of the Rideau Canal.

Disclosure Practices

Bujaki and fellow researcher Bruce McConomy, have found that most public companies will voluntarily disclose their governance practices based on strategic factors. These strategic factors will affect the choice of disclosure medium (annual report vs management information circular) as well as the extent of the disclosure. Some strategic factors include cost-benefit considerations, firm risk, and the number of external directors on a firm's board of directors. Bujaki and McConomy have also found that extensive disclosures are made after a governance failure, implying that disclosure practices are based on a reactive approach rather than proactive approach.

Women in Management

Bujaki and fellow researcher Carol McKeen, published an insightful article entitled Hours Spent on Household Tasks by Business School Graduates. Bujaki and McKeen's findings suggest that household and family responsibilities negatively affect a woman's career success more than a male's career success. They also notice that the presence of children significantly increases time spent on household activities. With children, household tasks grow from 3 to 10 hours a week for male graduates, while for female graduates, it grows from 10 hours a week to 20 hours a week. Bujaki and McKeen suggest that organizational initiatives and changes in expectations within family and society are needed to effectively accommodate a graduate's career success and their household responsibilities.

Rideau Canal

In 2007, Bujaki received a $27,886 Research Development Initiatives grant from the Social Sciences and Humanities Research Council of Canada (SSHRC). This grant was given for her research program of the accounting and management history of the Rideau Canal. The report program is entitled The Rideau Waterway: Management, Accounting, Governance and Accountability and will study the evolution of management practices over the life of the canal.

References

External links
 Telfer Executive MBA Program Faculty and Staff
 Telfer Accounting Professor Directory

Academic staff of the University of Ottawa
Living people
Canadian accountants
Year of birth missing (living people)